Zoianillus is a genus of ground beetles in the family Carabidae. This genus has a single species, Zoianillus acutipennis. It is found in Ecuador.

References

Trechinae
Monotypic Carabidae genera